The Kŭmsŏng Tractor Factory, located in Kiyang-dong, Kangsŏ-guyŏk, Namp'o, is North Korea's largest manufacturer of tractors, bulldozers, and other agricultural equipment. Peak production capacity is 10,000 tractors per year. The factory's current products include the Ch'ŏllima 28 , Ch'ŏllima 32 , Ch'ŏllima 40 , P'ungnyŏn 75 , Sonyŏn  and Ch'ŏllima 2000 tractors, and the P'ungnyŏn bulldozer. As of 2017, the factory was producing the new 80-hp Ch'ŏllima 804 tractor model. Claims have been made this factory also produces TEL mobile missile platforms.

The facility is served by the Korean State Railway via Kangsŏ Station on the P'yŏngnam Line.

History

The plant was opened in 1954, rebuilt from the ruins of a chemical fertiliser plant destroyed during the Korean War, producing various agricultural implements. The first tractor, the 'Ch'ŏllima 28, entered production in 1958. The prototype of this tractor, which was reverse engineered from a Soviet design, was built up in forty days, but only ran in reverse gear. Production capacity was expanded significantly in the following years; between 1970 and 1978, output increased 8.7 times, and by 1979, only 30% of production was of the 28-horsepower model, with the other 70% being accounted for by the 75-hp P'ungnyŏn model. Automation is also extensive; for example, the process of making the gearbox and the engine blocks are each overseen by a single person. Both Kim Il-sung and Kim Jong-il visited the factory numerous times to offer on-the-spot guidance; there is a large monument commemorating the first of Kim Il-sung's visits.

References

Companies of North Korea
Agriculture companies of North Korea